Georgian Cliff is a prominent cliff along George VI Sound, located just north of the terminus of Eros Glacier on the east side of Alexander Island, Antarctica. It was mapped from trimetrogon air photography taken by the Ronne Antarctic Research Expedition, 1947–48, and from survey by the Falkland Islands Dependencies Survey, 1948–50, and was so named by the UK Antarctic Place-Names Committee because it lies on George VI Sound.

References

Cliffs of Alexander Island